Dunaliella salina is a type of halophile green unicellular micro-algae especially found in hypersaline environments, such as salt lakes and salt evaporation ponds. Known for its antioxidant activity because of its ability to create large amount of carotenoids, it is responsible for most of the primary production in hypersaline environments worldwide, and is also used in cosmetics and dietary supplements.

History
Dunaliella salina was named by Emanoil C. Teodoresco of Bucharest, Romania after its original discoverer, Michel Felix Dunal, who first scientifically reported sighting the organism in saltern evaporation ponds in Montpellier, France in 1838. He initially named the organism Haematococcus salinus and Protococcus. The organism was fully described as a new, separate genus simultaneously by Teodoresco and Clara Hamburger of Heidelberg, Germany in 1905. Teodoresco was the first to publish his work, so he is generally given credit for this categorization.

Habitat
Few organisms can survive like D. salina does in such highly saline conditions as salt evaporation ponds. To survive, these organisms have high concentrations of β-carotene to protect against the intense light, and high concentrations of glycerol to provide protection against osmotic pressure. This offers an opportunity for commercial biological production of these substances.

It has been thought for a long time that the colour of pink lakes was the result of this alga, as it has been found in many pink lakes and contains substances in a range of hues which include pink. However, research done in Australia since 2015 in Lake Hillier found several species of halophilic bacteria and archaea as well as several species of Dunaliella, nearly all of which contain some pink, red or salmon-coloured pigment.

Morphology and characteristics
Species in the genus Dunaliella are morphogically similar to Chlamydomonas reinhardtii with the main exception being that Dunaliella lack both a cell wall and a contractile vacuole. Dunaliella has two flagella of equal length and has a single cup-like chloroplast that often contains a central pyrenoid. The chloroplast can hold large amounts of β-carotene, which makes it appear orange-red. The β-carotene appears to protect the organism from long-term UV radiation that D. salina is exposed to in its typical environments. D. salina comes in various shapes and symmetries depending on the conditions in its current environment.

D. salina lacks a rigid cell wall, which makes the organism susceptible to osmotic pressure. Glycerol is used as a means by which to maintain both osmotic balance and enzymatic activity. D. salina preserves a high concentration of glycerol by maintaining a cell membrane with low permeability to glycerol and synthesizing large quantities of glycerol from starch as a response to high extracellular salt concentration, which is why it tends to thrive in highly salinic environments.

Reproduction and lifecycle
D. salina can reproduce asexually through division of motile vegetative cells and sexually through the fusion of two equal gametes into a singular zygote. Though D. salina can survive in salinic environments, Martinez et al. determined that sexual activity of D. salina significantly decreases in higher salt concentrations (>10%) and is induced in lower salt concentrations. Sexual reproduction begins when two D. salina’s flagella touch leading to gamete fusion. The D. salina zygote is extraordinarily hardy and can survive exposure to fresh water and to dryness. After germination, the zygotes release up to 32 haploid daughter cells.

Commercial uses
D. salina is responsible for most of the primary production in hypersaline environments worldwide.

β-carotene
From a first pilot plant for D. salina cultivation for β-carotene production established in the USSR in 1966, the commercial cultivation of D. salina for the production of β-carotene throughout the world is now one of the success stories of halophile biotechnology. Different technologies are used, from low-tech extensive cultivation in lagoons to intensive cultivation at high cell densities under carefully controlled conditions.

Anti-oxidant & nutritional supplement
Due to the abundance of β-carotene, which is an anti-oxidant as well as a vitamin A precursor, D. salina is a popular pro-vitamin A food supplement and cosmetic additive. D. salina may also be a source of vitamin B12.

Glycerol
Attempts have been made to exploit the high concentrations of glycerol accumulated by D. salina as the basis for the commercial production of this compound. Although technically the production of glycerol from D. salina was shown to be possible, economic feasibility is low and no biotechnological operation exists to exploit the alga for glycerol production.

See also 

 Lake Hillier, Western Australia, Australia
 Lake Retba, Senegal
 Seaweed

References

Further reading
 Borowitzka, M.J. & Siva, C.J. (2007). The taxonomy of the genus Dunaliella (Chlorophyta, Dunaliellales) with emphasis on the marine and halophilic species. Journal of Applied Phycology 19: 567-590.
 Chen H., Lu Y. and Jiang J. “Comparative Analysis on the Key Enzymes of the Glycerol Cycle Metabolic Pathway in Dunaliella salina under Osmotic Stresses.” PLoS ONE, 2012, DOI: 10.1371/journal.pone.0037578
 Massjuk, N.P. & Lilitska, G.G. (2011). Dunaliellales. In: Algae of Ukraine: diversity, nomenclature, taxonomy, ecology and geography. Volume 3: Chlorophyta. (Tsarenko, P.M., Wasser, S.P. & Nevo, E. Eds), pp. 152–157. Ruggell: A.R.A. Gantner Verlag K.-G..
 Mixed Carotenoids. Rejuvenal healthy aging, n.d. Web. 22 Nov 2012.
 Smith D., Lee R., Cushman J., Magnuson J., Tran D. and Polle J.” The Dunaliella salina organelle genomes: large sequences, inflated with intronic and intergenic DNA.” BMA Plant Biology, 2010. DOI: 10.1186/1471-2229-10-83
 Zhao, R., Cao, Y., Xu, H., Lv, L., Qiao, D. & Cao, Y. (2011). Analysis of expressed sequence tags from the green alga Dunaliella salina (Chlorophyta). Journal of Phycology 47(6): 1454-1460.

External links
 
 MicrobeWiki reference on Dunaliella salina

Chlamydomonadales